William Robert Ponting (1872 – 21 March 1952) was an English amateur footballer who played as a half-back for Southampton St. Mary's in 1896–97, when they won the Southern League title for the first of six occasions over the next eight years.

Football career
Ponting was born in Andover, Hampshire where he became a schoolmaster. He was a leading amateur player for his local club and had been captain of the Hampshire County Junior XI in 1893.

In March 1897, John Hodgkinson, the Southampton St. Mary's left-half was injured and the "Saints" called Ponting into the side for the remaining five matches of the season. Ponting made his debut in a 5–1 victory at Reading on 31 March and played his part in the run-in to Southampton's first Southern League title.

Later career
In the summer of 1897, Ponting returned to his teaching career. In the 1930s, he was working in the City of London as an insurance broker.

Honours
Southampton
Southern League champions: 1896–97

References

1872 births
1952 deaths
People from Andover, Hampshire
English footballers
Association football defenders
Andover F.C. players
Southampton F.C. players
Southern Football League players
Ryde Sports F.C. players